The Kalinin K-13 was a bombing aircraft designed by Konstantin Kalinin in 1933. The aircraft was developed in response to a requirement issued by the Soviet VVS, but never entered production.

Development 
The Kalinin-led OKB began work on the K-13 beginning in 1933, in response to a specification issued by the Soviet Air Force for a new bomber aircraft. In detail, the required features provided for a long-range aircraft, capable of carrying one ton of bombs at a distance of 5000 km, flying at 4000 meters altitude at a speed of at least 350 km/h. In 1934, a passenger variant was also presented, the Kalinin K-14, which was unsuccessfully submitted to those responsible for civil air transport. A mock-up of the K-13 was built in Voronezh in 1936, but the aircraft was judged inferior to the designs submitted by Tupolev and Ilyushin, the other two technical offices that had responded to the specifications issued.

Design 
The K-13 used various technical solutions developed for the Kalinin K-12. This aircraft was supposed to be a metal monoplane, powered by two liquid-cooled M-34 engines placed in the wings. The expected payload was one ton of bombs, while for defense three machine were carried, two in the front and one in a tail turret. There were thee crew: a pilot, front gunner/bomb aimer, and rear gunner. The civilian version should have been able to carry twelve passengers, in addition to two crew members. The speed was expected to be approximately 429 km/h.

References 

1930s Soviet bomber aircraft
Kalinin aircraft